Ernst Brockelmann was a  cargo ship that was built in 1927 by Neptun AG, Rostock, Germany for Ehrich Ahrens. In 1945, she was seized by the Allies and passed to the Ministry of War Transport (MoWT), renamed Empire Concession. In 1946, she was sold into merchant service and renamed Brazen Head. In 1950, she was sold to Finland and renamed Enso. A further sale in 1959 saw her renamed Hakuni. In 1966, she was sold to Panama and renamed Isla Del Rey. She was scrapped in June 1966.

Description
The ship was built in 1927 by Neptun AG, Rostock.

She had a GRT of 1,900 and a NRT of 1,120, which had reduced to 966 by 1950.

The engine was built by Neptun AG.

History
Ernst Brockelmann was built for Ehrich Ahrens, Rostock. Her port of registry was Rostock and the Code Letters MFPT were allocated. In 1934, her Code Letters were changed to DMBY. In May 1945, Ernst Brockelmann was seized by the Allies at Flensburg. She was passed to the MoWT and renamed Empire Concession. She was placed under the management of the Burnett Steamship Co Ltd. Her port of registry was changed to London. The Code Letters GFLT and United Kingdom Official Number 180658 were allocated.

In 1945, Empire Concession was sold to Blandy, Bros & Co, London and renamed Brazen Head. In 1950. Brazen Head was sold to Enso Gutzeit Oy, Helsinki, Finland and was renamed Enso. She was placed under the management of Oy Baltic Chartering AB, Helsinki. Her port of registry was changed to Kotka. Enso was allocated the code letters OYPZ and the Finnish Official Number 538. She was operated under the management of Oy Baltic Chartering Ab, Helsinki. In 1954, management was transferred to Oy Finnlines Ab, Helsinki.

In 1955-56, Enso was refitted. This reduced her GRT to 1,803 while lengthening her to  overall. She was sold to Raumanmeri Oy, Rauma in 1959. The ship was renamed Hakuni and placed under the management of A Fagerström, Rauma. Her port of registry was changed to Rauma and the Finnish Official Number 596 was allocated. In 1962, Raumanmeri Oy took over operation of the ship themselves. At that time, the ship was assessed as ice class IC. In 1966, Hakuni was sold to Mendez Moreno, Panama and was renamed Isla Del Rey. She was scrapped at Alicante, Spain in June 1966.

References

External links
 Photo of SS Hakuni

1927 ships
Ships built in Rostock
Steamships of Germany
Merchant ships of Germany
World War II merchant ships of Germany
Ministry of War Transport ships
Empire ships
Steamships of the United Kingdom
Merchant ships of the United Kingdom
Steamships of Finland
Merchant ships of Finland